FSV 63 Luckenwalde is a German football club based in Luckenwalde, Brandenburg, currently playing in the Regionalliga (IV).

History 

The earliest forerunner of FSV 63 Luckenwalde was founded in 1906 as BV 06 Luckenwalde, which became SG Luckenwalde-Süd in 1945 and BSG Motor Luckenwalde in 1951. After the Berlin Wall was erected, the club was re-founded in 1963 as TSV Luckenwalde and after unification renamed itself FSV 63 Luckenwalde.

The club was twice runner-up in the Berliner Landespokal during the 1920s and was a founding member of the Gauliga Berlin-Brandenburg (I).

After a number of seasons in the Brandenburg-Liga the club won the league in 2009 and earned promotion to the NOFV-Oberliga Nord. After a season there it was moved to the southern division of the league but returned to the north in 2012 where it played as an upper table side. A third-place finish in the league in 2015 qualified the club for the promotion play-offs to the enlarged Regionalliga Nordost against SSV Markranstädt, which Luckenwalde won and moved up.

Summary of previous names 
 1906–1945 BV 06 Luckenwalde
 1945–1951 SG Luckenwalde-Süd
 1951–1963 BSG Motor Luckenwalde
 1963–1990 TSV Luckenwalde
 since 1990 FSV 63 Luckenwalde

Current squad

Honours
The club's honours:
 Brandenburg-Liga
 Champions: 2009

Stadium 
FSV 63 Luckenwalde plays its home fixtures at the 3,000 capacity Werner-Seelenbinder-Stadion.

References

External links 
 FSV 63 Luckenwalde 

Football clubs in Germany
Football clubs in Brandenburg
Football clubs in East Germany
Association football clubs established in 1963
1963 establishments in East Germany